Mariolaemus is a genus of beetles in the family Laemophloeidae, containing the following species:

 Mariolaemus eichelbaumi Grouvelle
 Mariolaemus escalerai Grouvelle
 Mariolaemus livens Grouvelle
 Mariolaemus misellus Grouvelle

References

Laemophloeidae